Hemicrepidius thomasi is a species of click beetle belonging to the family Elateridae. It is found in North America.

References

Beetles described in 1839
Beetles of North America
thomasi